The Moreland Act was an act passed by the New York Legislature and signed into law in 1907. It was introduced by Sherman Moreland, the Republican leader of the legislature. He proposed the act at the urging of New York Governor Charles Evans Hughes. It was known as Section 7 of the Executive Law from 1907 to 1909 and Section 8 from 1909 to 1951. It is now known as Section 6 of the Executive Law.

The act allows the governor, in person or through one or more persons appointed by the governor, to examine management and affairs of any department, board, bureau or commission in the state. Investigators could interview witnesses, administer oaths, hold hearings, and seize any material deemed relevant to the investigator's case. The investigators then had to use that intelligence to recommend legislative actions.

List of commissions appointed under the Moreland Act

Note: This list may not be complete.

1915 - Commission to Examine and Investigate the Management and Affairs of the Office of the Fiscal Supervisor of State Charities, the State Board of Charities, the Sites, Buildings and Grounds Commission, the Building Improvement Commission, and the Salary Classification Commission, appointed by Governor Charles S. Whitman
1928 - Commission for Investigation of Workmen's Compensation Law Administration, appointed by Governor Al Smith.
1953 - Commission to Study, Examine and Investigate State Agencies in Relation to Pari-Mutuel Harness Racing, appointed by Governor Thomas Dewey.
1961 - Bingo Control Inquiry, appointed by Governor Nelson Rockefeller.
1961 - Commission on Welfare, appointed by Governor Rockefeller.
1963 - Commission on the Alcoholic Beverage Control Law, appointed by Governor Rockefeller.
1976 - Commission to Investigate Nursing Homes, appointed by Governor Hugh Carey.
1987 - Commission on Government Integrity, appointed by Governor Mario Cuomo.
2012 - Commission to investigate New York utilities' response to Hurricane Sandy, appointed by Governor Andrew Cuomo.
2013 - Commission to Investigate Public Corruption, appointed by Governor Andrew Cuomo.

References

External links
Record of the Moreland Act

Political history of New York (state)
1907 in law
New York (state) statutes